"Advanced Safety Features" is the seventh episode of the sixth season of the American comedy television series Community, and the 104th episode of the series overall. It was released on Yahoo! Screen in the United States on April 21, 2015. The episode also features product placement by Honda throughout the episode.

Plot
In the study room, the Save Greendale Committee is going over plans for the upcoming alumni dance. Next on the agenda is Chang's PowerPoint presentation followed by Frankie's lecture on guerrilla marketing, a sales technique which is now a problem at Greendale, evidenced by Pelton who announces his need to buy a Honda. Once the meeting ends, Elroy quickly leaves and Chang suggests it's because he hasn't found his role in the group yet. This leads to everyone commenting on how much they miss Troy. Frankie asks why he was special and Jeff tells her he played the steel drums. Later in the hallway, Annie warns Britta that her boyfriend from season three's "Digital Exploration of Interior Design" (Travis Schuldt) is in the school's parking lot.

Britta rushes off to see him and finds that he's still a corporate tool, except this time he's working for Honda. He cuts short a presentation he was giving and reintroduces himself to Britta as "Rick". Although he claims to be here for her she realizes his main purpose is to sell his company's brand. Britta watches Rick convince Dean Pelton to upgrade a new Honda he bought for a more expensive vehicle. Despite her disgust, she ends up joining Rick in the backseat of his car. Over at Jeff's office, Annie and Abed tell Jeff about their plan to befriend Elroy. He accepted an invitation to join them in playing a '90s board game called "The Ears Have It". Back in the parking lot, Rick and Britta's afterglow is interrupted by Dean Pelton. Rick asks Britta to hide while he deals with Pelton who just made multiple Honda purchases.

While Rick is distracted by the "level seven susceptible", Britta exits the car and storms off. Over in the study room, Jeff finds Annie, Abed, and Chang playing a spirited game and enjoying each other's company. Elroy leaves upon his arrival which Chang points out and has Abed speculating that he doesn't like Jeff. At "The Vatican", Britta is tending bar when a customer shows up. She convinces him to buy scotch only to learn he's in cahoots with Rick who enters the bar. Rick introduces his Honda boss and proposes that Britta becomes his marketing partner. Although this will allow them to be a couple in public, Britta is reluctant to force people to buy unnecessary things. Rick's boss points out she already does this by bringing up the scotch Britta got him to buy. Britta accepts their offer and seals the deal by kissing Rick.

The next day the new couple are in the cafeteria and together convince Todd to consider buying a Honda. Annie, Abed, Chang, and Elroy are seated at a table nearby watching the pair in amusement. When Jeff tries to join them Elroy gets up to leave. Before he goes, Abed gives Elroy an exclusive CD of his favorite band "Natalie Is Freezing" which Jeff makes sure to remember. Elsewhere, Frankie stops by Dean Pelton's office and finds him surrounded by an overwhelming amount of Honda products. Once Frankie scolds Pelton for his gullibility he breaks down crying and she tries to comfort him. That night, Britta brings Rick over to her parents' house for dinner. Things go well until Rick starts to covertly sell George and Deb on Honda vehicles.

Back at school, the committee is finishing the alumni dance decorations in the cafeteria. Jeff shows up and announces he booked the band "Natalie is Freezing" for the event which infuriates Elroy. He calls Jeff out on his obvious attempts to win his favor and leaves just as the band arrives. Meanwhile, Britta and Rick argue as they drive home from her parents' house. She's upset he's always on the job and he's frustrated she can't understand that's who he is. Britta demands to be let out of the car and makes her way back to the Vatican for another shift. Elroy shows up for a drink at the bar and tells her their favorite band is playing at Greendale. He admits he dated the lead singer Julie (Lisa Loeb) which ended so poorly he hasn't let anyone close to him since. Britta sympathizes but advises him against shutting everyone out.

Rick then appears and declares that he'll quit his job for Britta. They go to the dance where Rick overhears Frankie mentioning the Dean wanting to buy a fleet of vehicles. Over Britta's protestations, Rick leaves to do one last big score. In the student lounge, Elroy gets some closure when he tells Julie how much she hurt him and also manages to make up with Jeff. Meanwhile, Britta finds out Rick was set up by Pelton and Frankie. As security escorts Rick off campus his Honda boss tries and fails to comfort Britta. Afterwards, the committee attends the concert and sees Frankie on stage playing the steel drums. Elroy and Jeff later share a drink at the bar as Britta sadly cleans some glasses. Somewhere far away, Rick is driving his Honda as tears fall from his eyes.

Cultural references
Britta disagrees with Rick over the quality of the film Avatar. Later Britta and Rick discuss the film Chariots of Fire, with Rick quoting a line in the film, "When I run, I feel His pleasure."

Production
In February 2015, it was reported that Travis Schuldt would return to the series as Subway/Rick, and that Billy Zane would also make a guest appearance as a character who wanted to recruit Britta for her unique abilities. During the episode various scenes were shot outdoors on the CBS Studio City backlot.

Critical reception
Alan Sepinwall of HitFix points to the moment in this episode when "Frankie tried to console the Dean even as she was calling him stupid," as "a nice moment" for Paget Brewster's character. Joshua Alston from The A.V. Club found that the episode "captures Community's themes so perfectly, it's comforting even when it isn't bringing the laughs," and found, "Frankie turning the Dean into her lapdog to help take down Rick for his shady salesmanship," one of the funniest parts of the story. He also says that "there are limits to how deftly a show can overtly integrate advertising," but that the overt product integration is ridiculously funny. Eric Goldman of IGN mentions, "Chang’s PowerPoint presentation got funnier and funnier as it went on," and points to Jeff's realization that someone doesn't like him, as another facet of the episode's story-line that made this episode especially good. In Yahoo's Robert Chan weekly Postmortem with Communitys Dan Harmon, Chan says, "nobody's cooler than Keith David." For the first time, the character of Elroy becomes integral to the episode's story-line. At the same time Harmon cautions the relevance of other established series regulars, like Alison Brie's character, Annie, which in this episode seems to have faded into the background.

DVD release
The DVD version changes the episode's title to "Advanced Safety Feature." Netflix also uses this title.

References

External links
 "Advanced Safety Features" at Yahoo! Screen.com
 

2015 American television episodes
Community (season 6) episodes
Works about marketing